Scarborough—Rouge Park is a federal electoral district in Ontario, Canada, that has been represented in the House of Commons of Canada since 2015.

Scarborough—Rouge Park was created by the 2012 federal electoral boundaries redistribution and was legally defined in the 2013 representation order. It came into effect upon the call of the 42nd Canadian federal election that took place on October 19, 2015. It was created out of parts of the electoral districts of Pickering—Scarborough East (49%), Scarborough—Rouge River (36%) and Scarborough—Guildwood (14%).

Geography
The riding consists of the eastern part of the Scarborough district of Toronto. It contains the neighbourhoods of Morningside Heights, Rouge, Port Union, West Rouge, Highland Creek, West Hill (east of Morningside Avenue) and Malvern (east of Neilson Road).

Demographics
According to the Canada 2021 Census

Ethnic groups: 35.4% South Asian, 23.6% White, 15.0% Black, 8.9% Filipino, 4.4% Chinese, 1.4% Latin American, 1.3% West Asian, 1.1% Southeast Asian, 1.0% Arab
Languages: 55.2% English, 10.6% Tamil, 4.3% Tagalog, 1.9% Bengali, 2.1% Urdu, 1.8% Cantonese, 1.5% Punjabi, 1.4% Gujarati, 1.1% Mandarin, 1.0% Hindi
Religions: 47.9% Christian (22.9% Catholic, 2.8% Anglican, 2.5% Christian Orthodox, 2.5% Pentecostal, 1.3% United Church, 1.2% Baptist, 1.1% Presbyterian, 13.6% Other), 20.0% Hindu, 12.0% Muslim, 1.4% Sikh, 1.1% Buddhist, 17.0% None
Median income: $37,200 (2020) 
Average income: $47,840 (2020)

Members of Parliament

This riding has elected the following Members of Parliament:

Election results

References

Ontario federal electoral districts
Federal electoral districts of Toronto
Scarborough, Toronto
2013 establishments in Ontario